Duke Constantine Frederick Peter of Oldenburg (– ) was a Duke of the House of Oldenburg. He was the grandfather of Duke Peter of Oldenburg as well as grandfather of Grand Duke Nicholas Nikolaevich, General of the Imperial Russian Army during World War I. His great-great grandson, Nicholas Romanov, was the President of the Romanov Family Association until his death in 2014.

Peter of Oldenburg was a scholar and philanthropist. He was also noted composer of music. In 1857 he composed the music for Marius Petipa's ballet La Rose, la Violette et le Papillon. The Pas d'Esclave from the ballet Le Corsaire, which is taken from his score for this work, is still heard in theatres all over the world.

Early life 
Duke Peter was born on 26 August 1812 in Yaroslavl, Russia. His father, Duke George, who was only the second son of the reigning Duke of Oldenburg, had no prospects of inherited his father's state or fortune of his own and was living in Russia since his marriage in 1809 to Grand Duchess Catherine Pavlovna of Russia. Duke George, who had been appointed governor on the Volga, died six month after Peter, his second, was born. Peter's mother Grand Duchess Catherine Pavlovna was the favorite sister of Tsar Alexander I of Russia who  took his two nephews, Peter and his older brother Alexander, under his protection. The brothers lived in Russia until his mother married King William I of Württemberg in 1816. They moved to Württemberg and were  educated in Stuttgart. At the death of his mother, less than three years later, Peter and his brother were sent to their grandfather in Oldenburg. Being in direct line of succession to the throne of Oldenburg, as their uncle the hereditary Grand Duke Augustus was unmarried at the time, both boys were given the same extensive education by their grandfather Duke Peter as he had given his own sons and were regularly sent on instructive trips around Germany to broaden their education.

In May 1829 his grandfather died and after the death of his brother Alexander in November of the same year, Peter's maternal uncle, Tsar Nicholas I of Russia  sent for Peter, and named him a colonel in the Lifeguards. He quickly rose through the ranks and was subsequently appointed lieutenant general. After four years service he retired, and became active in St. Petersburg government. In 1834 he was made a Russian senator, and it was from that time that his name began to be known as a great philanthropist, devoting his energies primarily to education. He founded the Imperial School of Jurisprudence, at which Russia's future judges and  administrators were educated, and in 1844 he was appointed head of an organization to further the education of women.

Peter of Oldenburg was also a scholar, speaking eight languages. As honorary president of the Tsarina Maria Trust, he also played a leading role in overseeing the development of hospitals in Russia, one of which in St Petersburg was called the Prince Peter of Oldenburg Children Hospital. He also made substantial donation to school building programs in Oldenburg, his country of origin.

Marriage 
On 23 April 1837 Duke Peter married Therese Wilhelmine Friederikke, Princess of Nassau-Weilburg in Biebrich. This was a happy marriage that lasted  for more than thirty years. They had eight children, three of them died early. A daughter Cecilie died  in childhood in 1843 and  another daughter, Catherine and a son George died from tuberculosis in 1866 and 1871 respectively. Duke Peter and his wife led an exemplary family life, and looked carefully after the education of their children. The family spent the winter months in Peterhof and moved for the summer to their other residence Kamenoi-Ostroff.

Composer 
Duke Peter was a talented pianist and composer, and in 1842 he composed his first major piano concerto. In 1844 his second piano concerto was performed for the first time at the Mikhailovsky Palace by the great pianist Clara Schumann, and conducted by his longtime friend and colleague Adolf von Henselt.

As with most Russian nobility, Duke Peter was a longtime balletomane and patron of the arts. In 1857 he was commissioned to compose the score for Marius Petipa's ballet-divertissement La Rose, la Violette et le Papillon, which was given as a performance for the royal court at the Imperial Theatre of Tsarskoe Selo. In 1858 Petipa extracted a Pas de Deux from the Duke's score and added it to his revival of the ballet Le Corsaire, renaming the piece the Pas d'Esclave. It is the only composition of Duke Peter's still heard today in the theater.

Many of Duke Peter's compositions were used as educational tools by the Saint Petersburg Conservatory. The composer and teacher Adolf von Henselt, a close friend of the Duke's, expanded on many of his compositions in order to utilize them for instructional purposes.

Last years 
Peter spent fifty years in Russia's service, for which he was  widely respected and was thanked by a massive celebration in St Petersburg in 1880 attended by his first cousin Tsar Alexander II of Russia and most of the Imperial family, his cousin Grand Duke Nicholas of Oldenburg and  representatives of the many organizations with which the Duke was connected. He was close to Tsar Alexander II and took his assassination in March 1881 very badly and died two months later on 14 May 1881 in St. Petersburg.

Children 
 Alexandra of Oldenburg (2 June 1838, St. Petersburg – 13 April 1900 Kiev, Ukraine); m. Grand Duke Nicholas Nikolaevich of Russia (1831–1891).
 Nicholas of Oldenburg (9 May 1840, St. Petersburg – 20 January 1886, Geneva, Switzerland); m.  Maria Bulazel created Countess von Osternburg.
 Cecile of Oldenburg (27 February 1842 St. Petersburg – 11 January 1843, St. Petersburg)
 Alexander of Oldenburg (2 June 1844, St Petersburg, – 6 September 1932, Biarritz, France). Heir of the Russian Oldenburgs. He was once a candidate to the Bulgarian throne.  He married Princess Eugenia Maximilianovna of Leuchtenberg. Their only son, Duke Peter Alexandrovich of Oldenburg, married Grand Duchess Olga Alexandrovna of Russia.
 Catherine of Oldenburg (21 September 1846, St. Petersburg – 23 June 1866, St. Petersburg)
 George of Oldenburg (17 April 1848, St. Petersburg – 17 March 1871, St. Petersburg)
 Constantin of Oldenburg  (27 April 1850, St. Petersburg – 18 March 1906 in Nice, France); m. Agrippina Japaridze, created Countess von Zarnekau
 Therese of Oldenburg (30 March 1852, St. Petersburg – 18 April 1883 St. Petersburg); m. George Maximilianovich, 6th Duke of Leuchtenberg (1852–1912)

Honours

Ancestry

Notes

Bibliography 
McIntosh, David, The Russian Oldenburgs, in Royalty History Digest.

External links

1812 births
1881 deaths
Russian ballet composers
Members of the State Council (Russian Empire)
Honorary members of the Saint Petersburg Academy of Sciences
Nobility from Saint Petersburg
Dukes of Oldenburg
19th-century composers
Recipients of the Order of St. Anna, 1st class
Recipients of the Order of St. Vladimir, 1st class
Recipients of the Order of the White Eagle (Russia)
Recipients of the Order of the Netherlands Lion
Grand Crosses of the Order of Saint Stephen of Hungary
Musicians from Saint Petersburg
People from Yaroslavl